The 1959 All-Ireland Junior Hurling Championship was the 38th staging of the All-Ireland Junior Championship since its establishment by the Gaelic Athletic Association in 1912.

Cork entered the championship as the defending champions, however, they were beaten by Antrim in the All-Ireland home final.

The All-Ireland final was played on 4 October 1959 at Croke Park in Dublin, between London and Antrim, in what was their first ever meeting in the final. London won the match by 5–10 to 2–10 to claim their third championship title overall and a first title in 10 years.

Results

All-Ireland Junior Hurling Championship

All-Ireland semi-finals

All-Ireland home final

All-Ireland final

References

Junior
All-Ireland Junior Hurling Championship